The 2012–13 season in Primera División de Nicaragua was divided into two tournaments (Apertura and Clausura) and determined the 61st and 62nd champions in the history of the league. It also provided the country's sole berth for the 2013–14 CONCACAF Champions League. The Apertura tournament was played in the second half of 2012, while the Clausura was played in the first half of 2013.

Promotion and relegation
Promoted from Segunda División de Fútbol Nicaragua.
 Champions: Xilotepelt

Relegated to Segunda División de Fútbol Nicaragua.
 Last place: Real Madriz.

Team information
Last updated: July 7, 2011

Stadia and locations

Personnel and sponsoring (2012 Apertura)

Managerial Changes

Before the start of the season

During the season

Apertura
The 2012 Apertura was the first tournament of the season. It began in August 2012.

Regular season
The regular season began in August 2012. The top four finishers will move on to the next stage of the competition.

Standings

Results

Positions by round

Finals round
The top two finishers in the Semi-finals Group will move on to the final.

Semi-finals Group

Final

First leg

Second leg

Top scorers

Updated to games played on 14 September 2012.  Post-season goals are not included, only regular season goals.

List of foreign players in the league
This is a list of foreign players in Apertura 2012. The following players:
have played at least one apertura game for the respective club.
have not been capped for the Nicaragua national football team on any level, independently from the birthplace

A new rule was introduced this year, that clubs can have upwards of five foreign players in a squad, However some conditions include: The player has to be younger than 30 years old, spent year abroad away from Nicaragua, and clubs can only have four foreign players on the field at one time .

Chinandega
  Andres Giraldo
  Gustavo Reyes
  Juan Davis Restrepo
  Víctor Norales
  Cristian Rodríguez

Diriangén FC
  Johnni Saavedra
  Christian Mena
  Wilson Flores
  Gerson Martínez

Juventus Managua
  Victor Carrasco
  Jorge Hernandez
  Daniel Henao
  Ronny Colon

Managua
  Jose Flores
  Christian Batiz
  Luis Fernando González
  Fernando Copete
  Herberth Cabrera

 (player released mid season)

Ocotal
  Luis Maradiaga
  Marcos Rivera
  Byron Maradiaga
  Cesar Salandia

Real Esteli
  Elmer Mejia
  Manuel Rosas
  Fernando Alvez
  Ronald Quintero
  Gabriel Mirazo Villar

Xilotepelt
  Oscar Castillo
  Mandell Scott
  George Tinglin
  Álvaro Salazar

Walter Ferretti
  Mario Gracia
  David da Silva
  Darwig Ramirez
  Darwin Guity
  Víctor Lozano

Clausura
The 2013 Clausura was the second tournament of the season.

Personnel and sponsoring (2013 Clausura)

Managerial Changes

Before the start of the season

During the season

Clausura
The 2013 Clausura was the first tournament of the season. It began in August 2012.

Regular season
The regular season began on 2013. The top four finishers will move on to the next stage of the competition.

Standings

Results

Positions by round

Finals round
The top two finishers in the Semi-finals Group will move on to the final.

Semi-finals Group

Final

First leg

Second leg

 The game was called after sixty six minutes of play after Walter Ferretti fan base caused to much disruption to the games with rioting, flares and objects being thrown on the pitch, Real Esetli won the series 6-0 on aggregate.

List of foreign players in the league
This is a list of foreign players in Apertura 2012. The following players:
have played at least one apertura game for the respective club.
have not been capped for the Nicaragua national football team on any level, independently from the birthplace

A new rule was introduced this year, that clubs can have upwards of five foreign players in a squad, However some conditions include: The player has to be younger than 30 years old, spent year abroad away from Nicaragua, and clubs can only have four foreign players on the field at one time .

Chinandega
  Andres Giraldo
  Gustavo Reyes
  Juan Davis Restrepo
  Víctor Norales
  Cristian Rodríguez

Diriangén FC
  Johnni Saavedra
  Christian Mena
  Wilson Flores
  Gerson Martínez
  Lucas Martella
  Luis Rodriguez

Juventus Managua
  Victor Carrasco
  Jorge Hernandez
  Daniel Henao
  Ronny Colon

Managua
  Jose Flores
  Christian Batiz
  Luis Fernando González
  Fernando Copete
  Herberth Cabrera

 (player released mid season)

Ocotal
  Juan José Tablada
  Marcos Rivera
  José Javier Mejía
  Cesar Salandia
  Jonathan Juárez

Real Esteli
  Elmer Mejia
  Assad Esteves
  Paulo Ortiz
  Ronald Quintero
  Gabriel Mirazo Villar

Xilotepelt
  Oscar  Palomino Castillo
  Jaime Romo 
  George Tinglin
  Gilberth Sequeira

Walter Ferretti
  Pedro Augusto Pedrinho
  Mayco Santana
  Darwig Ramirez
  Mitchel Williams
  Víctor Lozano

Aggregate table

References

External links
 http://www.futbolnica.net/
 https://int.soccerway.com/national/nicaragua/1a-division/2011-2012/apertura/
 http://www.lusaco.tk/

Nicaraguan Primera División seasons
1
Nicaragua